Horta may refer to:

People 
 Horta (surname), a list of people

Places 
 Horta, Africa, an ancient city and former bishopric in Africa Proconsularis, now in Tunisia and a Latin Catholic titular see
 Horta, Azores, Portugal, a municipality and city on the island of Faial
 Horta (district), Portugal, a former district of the Azores
 Horta, Portugal, a civil parish in the municipality of Vila Nova de Foz Côa
 Horta, Barcelona, Spain, a neighborhood in the Horta-Guinardó district of Barcelona
 Horta (Italy), an ancient city
 Horta of Valencia, a horticultural region in Central Valencia and a historic comarca of the Valencian Community
 Horta Nord, present-day comarca in the Valencian Community
 Horta Sud, present-day comarca in the Valencian Community
 Horta Oest, present-day comarca in the Valencian Community

Transportation 
 Horta (Barcelona Metro), the northern terminus of Barcelona metro line 5
 Horta premetro station, Saint-Gilles, Belgium
 Horta Airport, Azores, Portugal

Other uses 
 Horta (mythology), a goddess in Etruscan mythology
 Horta (food), Greek boiled green vegetables
 UA Horta, a football club based in Barcelona
 Horta or huerta, a fertile area or field in Portuguese, Catalan and Galician
 HORTA (mining), an underground geographic positioning technology used in mining
 Horta, an intelligent lifeform in the Star Trek episode "The Devil in the Dark"

See also
 Huerta (disambiguation)
 Hortus botanicus,  botanical garden